Sukumar Ray  (30 October 1887 – 10 September 1923) was a Bengali writer and poet from the Indian subcontinent. He is remembered mainly for his writings for children. He was the son of children's story writer Upendrakishore Ray Chowdhury and the father of Indian filmmaker Satyajit Ray.

Family history
According to the history of the Ray family, one of their ancestors, Ramsunder Deo (Deb), was a native of Chakdah village in Nadia district of present-day West Bengal, India. In search of fortune he migrated to Sherpur in East Bengal. There he met Raja Gunichandra, the zamindar of Jashodal, at the zamindar house of Sherpur. King Gunichandra was immediately impressed by Ramsunder's stately appearance and sharp intellect and took Ramsunder with him to his zamindari estate. He made Ramsunder his son-in-law and granted him some property in Jashodal. From then on Ramsunder started living in Jashodal. His descendants migrated from there and settled down in the village of Masua in Katiadi upazila of Kishoreganj district.

Early years
Sukumar Ray was born in a Brahmo family in Mymensingh, British India (present day Bangladesh) on 30 October 1887. His family hailed from Masua village of Mymensingh division of Eastern Bengal in British India, presently in Bangladesh. Sukumar's father Upendrakishore Ray was a famous Bengali writer, painter, violin player and composer, technologist, amateur astronomer  and entrepreneur. Sukumar's mother Bidhumukhi Devi was daughter of Dwarkanath Ganguly.

Born in the era which can be called the pinnacle of the Bengal Renaissance, he grew up in an environment that fostered his literary talents. His father was a writer of stories and popular science; painter and illustrator; musician and composer of songs; a technologist and hobbyist astronomer. Upendrakishore was also a close friend of Rabindranath Tagore, who directly influenced Sukumar. Among other family friends were Jagadish Chandra Bose, Prafulla Chandra Roy, Atul Prasad Sen etc. Upendrakishore studied the technology of blockmaking, conducted experiments, and set up a business of making blocks. The firm M/s U. Ray & Sons, where Sukumar and his younger brother Subinay were involved. His sister, Shukhalata Rao, became a social worker and children's book author. Like his father, Ray also had a close acquaintance with Rabindranath Tagore.

Education and profession

In 1906, Ray graduated with double Honours in Physics and Chemistry from the Presidency College, then affiliated with the University of Calcutta. Before that, he attended City College School, Surya Sen Street along with his classmate who inspired his famous funny character "Pagla Dashu", which appeared in several of his penned stories. He was trained in photography and printing technology in England at the School of Photo-Engraving and Lithography, London, and was a pioneer of photography and lithography in India. While in England, he also delivered lectures about the songs of Rabindranath before Tagore won the Nobel Prize. Meanwhile, Sukumar had also drawn acclaim as an illustrator. As a technologist, he also developed new methods of halftone blockmaking, and technical articles about this were published in journals in England. The Penrose Annual published two articles by Ray.  While in the United Kingdom, he joined the Royal Photographic Society in 1912 and remained a member until his death, gaining his Fellowship in 1922.

Upendrakishore started a publishing firm, U. Ray and Sons, which Sukumar and Subinay helped to run. While Sukumar went to England to learn printing technology, Upendrakishore purchased land, constructed a building, and set up a printing press with facilities for high-quality halftone color blockmaking and printing. He  launched the children's magazine, Sandesh, in May, 1913. Very soon after Sukumar's return from England his writings and sketches started appearing in Sandesh. After Upendrakishore died on 20 December 1915, Sukumar ran the printing and publishing businesses and the Sandesh for about eight years. His younger brother Subinoy helped him, and many relatives pitched in writing for "Sandesh".

Contribution in literature

Sukumar Ray delved into a unique genre of pure nonsense and gibberish, a pioneering work in Bengali literature with a few exceptions, work that was compared to Lewis Carrol's Alice in Wonderland. Amazing sense of humor, sharp power of observation and unfathomed wit merged with a profound command on selection of words produced a class of humor which was equally approachable by children as well as the grown ups. Satyajit Ray, in the preface of the first edition of the compilation of Sukumar Ray's complete works in his centenary year, Sukumar Sahitya Samagra, wrote: 
After his father's death in 1915, Sukumar had to take over responsibility of publication of "Sandesh", and his creativity reached its pinnacle. The 45 limericks in Abol Tabol and many other creations published in Sandesh still amuse the readers of all ages. He created many characters in his prose and poems. Kaath Buro, Tash Goru, Huko Mukho Hangla, Kumro Potash etc. were fictitious characters, though they were very close to our known world. He himself described his works as the product of Kheyal Ros (হঠাৎ ইচ্ছা;ঝোঁক/Wish; Whims; Freak; Fancy).

Death
Sukumar Ray died on 10 September 1923 in Kolkata from leishmaniasis, for which there was no cure at the time. He left behind his widow and their only child, Satyajit. Satyajit Ray would later shoot a documentary on Sukumar Ray in 1987, 5 years before his death.

Bibliography 
 Abol Tabol (The Weird and the Absurd)

 Pagla Dashu (Crazy Dashu)
 
 Khai-Khai (Eat-Eat)
 Heshoram Hushiyarer Diary (The diary of Heshoram Hushiyar) (early science fiction parody)
 HaJaBaRaLa (Mumbo-Jumbo)

 Jhalapala O Onanyo Natok (Cacophony and Other Plays)
 Lokkhoner Shoktishel (Lokkhon Shellshocked)
 Chalachittachanchari
 Shabdakalpadrum
 Bohurupi (Chameleon)
 Abak Jalpan (A Strange Drink of Water 1914)
 Bhasar Atyachar (Torture of Language 1915)
Barnamalatatva (Theory of Alphabet)

 Desh-Bidesher Golpo (Tales from Many Lands)
 Jiboner Hisab(Bidye bojhai babumoshai)

See also
 List of Indian writers

References

External links
  
 Complete Sukumar Ray
 "Drighangchu" by Sukumar Ray translation of short story in The Cafe Irreal

 
1887 births
1923 deaths
Bengali Hindus
20th-century Bengalis
19th-century Bengalis
Bengali poets
Bengali male poets
Writers from Kolkata
Bengali writers
Bengali-language writers
Bengali-language science fiction writers
Bengali zamindars
Culture of Kolkata
Indian children's writers
Indian illustrators
Indian children's book illustrators
Indian photographers
Brahmos
20th-century Indian photographers
Presidency University, Kolkata alumni
University of Calcutta alumni
Deaths from leishmaniasis
Indian poets
Indian male poets
20th-century Indian poets
Indian novelists
Indian male novelists
20th-century Indian novelists
Indian male writers
Indian editors
Indian magazine editors
20th-century Indian writers
20th-century Indian male writers
Photographers from West Bengal
Novelists from West Bengal
Poets from West Bengal
Indian science fiction writers
Indian comedy writers
Indian dramatists and playwrights
Indian male dramatists and playwrights
20th-century Indian dramatists and playwrights
Indian essayists
Indian male essayists
20th-century Indian essayists
Indian lithographers
Indian printers
Indian painters
Indian male painters
20th-century Indian painters
Indian publishers (people)
Indian book publishers (people)
Indian artists
Indian male artists
20th-century Indian artists
People from Mymensingh